or  was a major encyclopedia in the German language that existed in various editions, and by several titles, from 1839 to 1984, when it merged with the .

First edition

In contrast to its contemporaries, it contained maps and illustrations with the text.

There is no indication of the planned number of volumes or a time limit for this project, but little headway had been made by the otherwise dynamic . After six years, 14 volumes had appeared, covering only one fifth of the alphabet. Another six years passed before the last (46th) volume was published. Six supplementary volumes finally finished the work in 1855. Ultimately numbering 52 volumes,  was the most comprehensive completed German encyclopedia of the 19th century, also called "" (The marvellous Meyer). The complete set was reprinted 1858–59.

Later editions
To avoid a long-time project, subscribers were promised it would be completed within three years, and all volumes appearing later would be given free. Of course, it was finished right on time.

The 2nd edition, appeared 1861–67; the 3rd edition, now from Leipzig, was issued as  1874–78; both had 15 volumes.

The 4th edition, consisting of 16 volumes, appeared in 1885–90, with 2 supplements of update pages, volume 17 (1891) and volume 18 (1892). The 5th edition had 17 volumes, 1893 to 1897. This edition sold no less than 233,000 sets.

The 6th edition, entitled , was published 1902–08. It had 20 volumes, and the largest sale of all  editions, with 240,000 sets. The First World War prevented an even bigger success. There was also the small 1908 edition, .

World Wars and destruction
The 7th and 8th editions were both briefly named . The 7th edition counted only 12 volumes, due to the economic depression of the 1920s. It appeared in 1924–30.

The 8th edition (1936–42) remained incomplete due to wartime circumstances: out of 12 planned volumes only volumes number 1 through 9 plus the atlas volume number 12 could be issued.

The buildings of the company were completely destroyed by the bombing raids on Leipzig in 1943–44 and the company itself expropriated in 1946 without compensation. In 1953 the place of business was moved to Mannheim in West Germany; a "" remained in Leipzig.

9th edition and 
The 9th edition, now from Mannheim, entitled  (in 25 volumes), appeared in 1971–79. Just like the very first, this final  edition was the most comprehensive German encyclopaedia of the century.

From Leipzig (then in East Germany) came  (1961–64, 8 volumes; 2nd edition 1971–78, 18 volumes), embedded in the Marxist ideology.

Merger with 
In 1984, the  amalgamated with its biggest competitor in field of reference books  of Wiesbaden, in a so-called "" (wedding of elephants).

See also
 List of online encyclopedias

References

External links

 Wikimedia Commons has 16 books of the 4th edition, as 16,700+ images (German text + illustrations):
 Gallery: Commons:
 Book 1:   Commons:File:Meyers b1 s0001.jpg, etc.
 Book 2:   Commons:File:Meyers b2 s0001.jpg, etc.
 Book 16: Commons:File:Meyers b16 s0001.jpg, Commons:File:Meyers b16 s0002.jpg, etc. (each book has around 1020 pages. Book 5 page 967 is ... b5 s0967.jpg.)
 
 
 
 , 4th ed., 1885–92 online
 Hathi Trust
 
 

German encyclopedias
German-language encyclopedias
1839 establishments in Germany
19th-century encyclopedias
20th-century encyclopedias